Ilse Junkermann (born May 31, 1957 in Dörzbach an der Jagst) is the current German bishop of the Evangelical Church in Central Germany, a member church of the Evangelical Church in Germany. She was the first woman to become Landesbischof there. She is a pacifist.

Life 
Junkermann studied Protestant theology at the universities of Tübingen and Göttingen. Junkermann is divorced and has one son.

References

External links 
 Evangelical Church in Central Germany:Ilse Junkermann (german)
 Spiegel:Ilse Junkermann zur Bischöfin gewählt (german)

Women bishops
1957 births
Living people
Lutheran pacifists
21st-century German Lutheran bishops